Hang Down Your Head is a song by Tom Waits appearing on his 1985 album Rain Dogs. It released as a single in 1985 by Island Records. The song is in the same vein as Tom Waits' earlier work, featuring a more conventional melodic structure in comparison to other songs on his Rain Dogs album, albeit featuring an idiosyncratic arrangement. Allmusic critic Stewart Mason called the song "among the most direct and effective things Waits has ever written."

Cover versions 
Vocalist Lucinda Williams recorded a version of the song for the soundtrack of the crime/drama series Crossing Jordan, released in 2003. It was later appended as a bonus track to her 2003 album World Without Tears. Gothic rock ensemble Human Drama recorded the song for their covers' album Pinups, which was intended as a tribute to the various artists that had influenced them. Country artist Jack Ingram has played the song at live concerts, and his version was recorded for his live debut Live at Adair's in 1995.

Formats and track listing 
UK 7" single (107 761-100)
 "Hang Down Your Head" – 2:32
 "Tango Till They're Sore" – 2:49

Personnel
Adapted from the Hang Down Your Head liner notes.

 Tom Waits – vocals, guitar, pump organ, production
Musicians
Michael Blair – drums, percussion
Larry Taylor – double bass
Marc Ribot – guitar

Production and additional personnel
 Dennis Ferrante – recording
 Tom Gonzales – recording
 Robert Musso – engineering, mixing
 Howie Weinberg – mastering

Release history

References 

1985 songs
1985 singles
Tom Waits songs
Songs written by Tom Waits
Island Records singles
Songs written by Kathleen Brennan